Denis Yuryevich Golovanov (born 27 March 1979) is a former professional tennis player from Russia. In 2002, he won the  Hull challenger event, defeating future  top 20 players David Ferrer and Ivo Karlovic in the first two rounds.

Career
Golovanov failed to make it through qualifying for the 2002 Wimbledon Championships but was given entry into the main draw as a lucky loser, after British wild card James Auckland withdrew with an injury. He faced fellow lucky loser George Bastl in the first round. Bastl, who went on to upset Pete Sampras, defeated Golovanov in straight sets.

The Russian would never win a singles match on the ATP Tour. One of his losses was to Roger Federer at the 2002 Kremlin Cup.

Golovanov did however have some success as a doubles player, with the highlight of his career coming in 2001, when he and Yevgeny Kafelnikov won the St. Petersburg Open. The wild card pairing benefiting from a walkover in the quarter-finals, with top seeds Jiri Novak and David Rikl withdrawing.

He was also a doubles semi-finalist twice, both times partnering his childhood friend Marat Safin, in the 2000 Kremlin Cup and 2002 President's Cup. Safin would later hire Golovanov as his coach.

ATP career finals

Doubles: 1 (1–0)

Challenger titles

Singles: (1)

Doubles: (2)

References

1979 births
Living people
Russian male tennis players
Sportspeople from Sochi